Hjörleifshöfði is a -high inselberg in southern Iceland. It consists of palagonite.

Name
The name was given to the mountain by one of the first legendary settlers mentioned in the Landnámabók.

According to this, Hjörleifr Hróðmarsson was the brother-in-law of Ingólfur Arnarson, Iceland's first official settler. He settled at Hjörleifshöfði towards the end of the ninth century. There, however, he was slain by his slaves. The slaves fled to Vestmannaeyjar, where Ingólfur took his revenge for his friend and slew them.

On the top of the mountain is a mound called Hjörleifshaugur , where Hjörleifr is said to be buried.

Geology
The mountain is of volcanic origin but was covered by ice or seawater at the time of its formation, so it has a similar past as the nearby larger Hafursey mountain. Then it was an island surrounded by sea. At the time of the settlement of Iceland, it was already connected to the mainland, but there was still a fjord at its side, which was used to shore ships.

Later, the jökulhlaups, connected with the eruptions of the Katla volcano in Mýrdalsjökull, gathered so much sand and gravel that it was now not at the shore but surrounded by the mainland and the fjord was filled.

After the eruption of Katla in 1918, a tongue of land, Kötlutangi , led out into the sea so far that it was regarded as the southernmost point of Iceland. Meanwhile, however, the sea eroded it to the point that this title again belongs to the peninsula of Dyrhólaey.

Farm
By AD 874 there was a farm of the same name on the mountain. After the outbreaks of Katla in 1660 or 1721 it had been moved up.

The farm was regarded as relatively well-off because of the side-income from the hunt for seabirds and the collection of eggs.

In popular culture
The area was used for location filming for the 2016 Star Wars spinoff film Rogue One.

See also
Geography of Iceland
List of volcanoes in Iceland
History of Iceland

References

Mountains of Iceland
Mountains under 1000 metres
Inselbergs of Iceland
Former islands